David Pearson (born 1955) is an English librarian who served as the Director of Culture, Heritage and Libraries at the City of London Corporation between 2009 and 2017; his brief covered London Metropolitan Archives, Guildhall Library, City Business Library, Guildhall Art Gallery, and other institutions.  He retired in early 2017 to focus on his work in book history and is now a Senior Member of Darwin College, Cambridge (from 2016); Honorary Senior Research Associate of the Department of Information Studies, University College London (from 2016); and Senior Fellow of the Institute of English Studies, University of London (from 2017). A member of the Faculty of the Rare Book School at the University of Virginia, he teaches regularly at the London Rare Book School.

Education 
Pearson was educated at St Bees School (1967–1973) and is a graduate of the University of Cambridge (1974–1977, MA, PhD), and University of Loughborough (1980–81, Dip.Lib).

Career 
He was previously Director of the University of London Research Library Services (2004–2009), Librarian of the Wellcome Trust (1996–2004), Head of Special Collections at the National Art Library (1992–1996) and a curator in the Eighteenth-Century Short Title Catalogue project at the British Library (1986–1992).  He has lectured and published extensively on aspects of book history, with a particular emphasis on books as artefacts, and the ways in which they have been owned and bound.  His books include Provenance Research in Book History (1994, new edition 2019), Oxford Bookbinding 1500-1640 (2000), For the Love of the Binding (ed, 2000), English Bookbinding Styles 1450-1800 (2005, reprinted 2014), Books as History : The importance of books beyond their texts (2008), London: 1000 Years (ed, 2011), Book Ownership in Stuart England (2021), Speaking Volumes: Books with Histories (2022). He was President of the Bibliographical Society, 2010–2012. In 2017–2018, as J. P. R. Lyell Reader in Bibliography, University of Oxford, he delivered the Lyell Lectures on the topic “Book Ownership in Stuart England”.

References

English librarians
1955 births
Living people
Bookbinding